"Seaman's Blues" is a country music song written by Billy Tubb, sung by Ernest Tubb, and released on the Decca label (catalog no. 46119). In May 1948, it reached No. 5 on the Billboard folk best seller chart. It was also ranked as the No. 16 record on Billboard's 1948 year-end folk record sellers chart.

The song was later covered by other artists, including Hank Williams, Willie Nelson, and Merle Haggard (duet with Ernest Tubb).

References

Ernest Tubb songs
1948 songs